FIBA EuroCup All-Star Day, or FIBA EuroChallenge All-Star Day, was the All-Star Game of the now defunct 3rd-tier level European-wide professional basketball league, the FIBA EuroChallenge tournament. It started in 2004, and lasted for five editions until 2008. The FIBA EuroCup All-Star Day was the first All-Star Game that was organised by FIBA after the FIBA EuroStars, and after the year 2000 conflict between FIBA and EuroLeague Basketball, which ultimately resulted in the current EuroLeague's take over of the previous FIBA EuroLeague.

The EuroCup All-Star Day event included a match between Europe and the Rest of the World All-Stars, a 3-point shootout contest, and a slam dunk contest in the 2007 edition. Lithuanian players Saulius Štombergas and Gintaras Einikis, were the only players that played in both the FIBA EuroStars, and also the FIBA EuroCup All-Star Day. Svetislav Pešić and Stanislav Eremin were the only coaches to be selected to both events.

List of games
Bold: Team that won the game.

Three-Point Shootout

Slam-Dunk Contest

FIBA Europe League All-Star Day 2004

Place: Kyiv, Ukraine

Date: 16.03.2004

Result: Europe 84 – Rest of the World 91 

Europe roster: Saulius Štombergas, Eurelijus Žukauskas, Sergei Chikalkin, Laurent Sciarra, Armands Šķēle, Alexander Lokhmanchuk, Yaniv Green, Andris Biedriņš, Dmitri Domani, Andriy Lebediev. Coaches: Stanislav Eremin & Dragan Raca & Andrei Podkovyrov*Milan Gurović was selected to represent the Europe All-Stars, but he did not participate due to injury.

Rest of the World roster: Mahmoud Abdul-Rauf, Michael Wright, Roderick Blakney, Duane Woodward, Eric Campbell, Ashante Johnson, Tang Hamilton, Dametri Hill, Sharone Wright, Lorinza Harrington, Steve Goodrich. Coaches: Panagiotis Giannakis & Zvi Sherf & Aleksandar Petrović

Game MVP: Michael Wright

Top scorers: Michael Wright (23 points), Sergei Chikalkin (17 points), Eurelijus Žukauskas  (14 points)

3-point contest winner: Sergei Chikalkin

FIBA Europe League All-Star Day 2005

Place: Nicosia, Cyprus

Date: 14.04.2005

Result: Europe 102 – Rest of the World 106 

Europe roster: Kaspars Kambala, Ratko Varda, Jón Arnór Stefánsson, Damir Mršić, Lior Lubin, Krešimir Lončar, Ioannis Giannoulis, Ömer Onan, Radek Necas, Dimitar Angelov, Michalis Kounounis, Erez Markovich. Coaches: Aydın Örs & Dragan Raca

Rest of the World roster: Kelly McCarty, Khalid El-Amin, Ed Cota, Rubén Wolkowyski, Shammond Williams, Marcelo Nicola, Marc Salyers, LaMarr Greer, Michael McDonald, Art Long, Óscar Torres. Coaches: David Blatt & Renato Pasquali

Game MVP: Shammond Williams

Top scorers: Shammond Williams (20 points), Kaspars Kambala (20 points)

3-point contest winner: Marcelo Nicola

FIBA EuroCup All-Star Day 2006

Place: Limassol, Cyprus

Date: 14.03.2006

Result: Europe 89 – Rest of the World 97 

Europe roster: Damir Mršić, Kaspars Kambala, Gianmarco Pozzecco, Gintaras Einikis, Lior Eliyahu, Krešimir Lončar, Milutin Aleksić, Cătălin Burlacu, Artūras Jomantas, Georgios Palalas. Coach: Fotis Katsikaris

Rest of the World roster: Kelly McCarty, Mark Dickel, Khalid El-Amin, Óscar Torres, Rubén Wolkowyski, LaMarr Greer, Frankie King, Jarod Stevenson, Jaime Lloreda, Marcus Hatten, Michael Harris, Glen McGowan. Coaches: Aleksandar Petrović & Saša Obradović

Game MVP: Marcus Hatten

Top scorers: Kaspars Kambala (21 points), Marcus Hatten (17 points)

3-point contest winner: Jarod Stevenson

FIBA EuroCup All-Star Day 2007

Place: Limassol, Cyprus

Date: 20.03.2007

Result: Europe 95 – Rest of the World 105 

Europe roster: Laurent Sciarra, Krešimir Lončar, Artur Drozdov, Christian Drejer, Marc Gasol, Serhiy Lishchuk, Milutin Aleksić, Tutku Açık, Bekir Yarangüme, Sandis Valters, Nikolai Padius, Arvydas Cepulis. Coaches: Svetislav Pešić & Igors Miglinieks

Rest of the World roster: Ariel McDonald, Andre Hutson, Khalid El-Amin, Kennedy Winston, Erwin Dudley, Travis Reed, Guilherme Giovannoni, Travis Conlan, Marque Perry, Anthony Lux, Jeron Roberts, Curtis Millage. Coaches: Žare Markovski & Luka Pavićević

Game MVP: Erwin Dudley

Top scorers: Erwin Dudley (23 points), Serhiy Lishchuk (15 points)

3-point contest winner: Andreas Pilavas

Slam dunk contest winner: Ryan Randle

FIBA EuroCup All-Star Day 2008

Place: Limassol, Cyprus

Date: 25.03.2008

Result: Europe 116 – Rest of the World 118 

Europe roster: Yaniv Green, Krešimir Lončar, Ante Tomić, Giorgi Tsintsadze, Armands Šķēle, Milutin Aleksić, Martynas Andriukaitis, Mike Lenzly, Nando de Colo, Dimitris Verginis, Petri Virtanen, Sasa Bratic. Coaches: Valeri Tikhonenko & Željko Pavličević

Rest of the World roster: Demetrius Alexander, Ryan Randle, Duane Woodward, Alex Scales, Joe Smith, Adrian Henning, Olumuyiwa Famutimi, James Cantamessa, Brian Cusworth. Coaches: Chris Finch & Charles Barton

Game MVP: Joe Smith

Top scorers: Joe Smith (28 points), Nando de Colo (24 points), Alex Scales (23 points), Milutin Aleksić (20 points), Krešimir Lončar (18 points), Sasa Bratic (18 points), Adrian Henning (14 points), Demetrius Alexander (13 points)

3-point contest winner: Vasili Zavoruev

All-Star players

Players with most selections
Player nationalities by national team.

Players in FIBA All-Star Games (1996–2008)

FIBA All-Star Day players in NBA
 Mahmoud Abdul-Rauf
 Nando de Colo
 Khalid El-Amin
 Marc Gasol
 Óscar Torres

All-Star coaches

Coaches with most selections

Coaches in FIBA All-Star Games (1996–2008)

FIBA All-Star Day coaches in NBA
  David Blatt

See also
FIBA All-Star Games
FIBA EuroStars

References

Defunct basketball competitions in Europe
International club basketball competitions
Basketball all-star games